Ḥakīm Yazghel Ḥaqnaẓͅar was an Iranian Jewish court physician of Mohammad Shah Qajar (1834–1848) and Naser al-Din Shah Qajar (1848–1896). He was on good terms with Naser al-Din Shah's mother Malek Jahan Khanom, and with Jeyran, one of Naser al-Din Shah's beloved wives and first mistress. Haqnazar's grandfather had come to the capital Tehran from Khansar (northwest of Isfahan) in 1821 during the reign of Fath-Ali Shah Qajar (1797–1834). Haqnazar is credited with having founded the Hakim synagogue in the Jewish quarter of Tehran. His three brothers were also court physicians; his brother Hakim Musa (died 1881), also served under Mohammad Shah and Naser al-Din Shah.

References

Iranian Jews
People of Qajar Iran
Iranian physicians
Jewish physicians
19th-century physicians
19th-century Jews
Court physicians